Arthur Spark Rosenbaum (December 6, 1938 – September 4, 2022) was an American art professor at the University of Georgia, an artist, musician, and folklorist. He won a Grammy award in 2008 for Best Historical Album, for his music collection Art Of Field Recording Volume I: Fifty Years Of Traditional American Music Documented By Art Rosenbaum.

Life and career
Rosenbaum was born in Ogdensburg, upstate New York in 1938. His family moved around the United States during his childhood, spending time in Indianapolis and elsewhere, while his father was a member of the Army Medical Corps. He studied at Columbia University, receiving a BA and MFA.

Rosenbaum taught at the University of Georgia from 1976 to 2006. The Georgia Museum of Art later held an exhibition of his drawings and paintings. His other paintings include a mural in the Russell Special Collections Building on the UGA campus, featuring the faces of political figures from Georgia's history.  The book Weaving His Art on Golden Looms: Paintings and Drawings by Art Rosenbaum was published on October 1, 2006 by Georgia Museum of Art and William U. Eiland.

Rosenbaum was married to Margo Newmark and had one son. With his wife, he traveled around the United States for over 50 years, recording blues music, fiddle tunes, and other forms of traditional music.  Selections of his recordings were published as The Art of Field Recording: 50 Years of Traditional American Music. He also performed as a banjo player.

He died from cancer on September 4, 2022, in Athens, Georgia.

Bibliography
The Art of the Mountain Banjo (Fant) May 29, 2015 by Art Rosenbaum
Art Rosenbaum's Old-Time Banjo Book October 2, 2014 by Art Rosenbaum
Folk Visions and Voices: Traditional November 1, 1983 by Art Rosenbaum
The Mary Lomax Ballad Book May 2, 2013 by Art Rosenbaum

Discography
 Art of Field Recording Volume I: Fifty Years of Traditional American Music Documented by Art Rosenbaum

References

External Links

1938 births
2022 deaths
Grammy Award winners
University of Georgia faculty
Columbia College (New York) alumni
Columbia University School of the Arts alumni